Damn Vulnerable Linux (DVL) is a discontinued Linux distribution geared toward computer security students. It functioned as a tool for observing and studying vulnerabilities in the Linux kernel and popular user space software. It was available as a live DVD, and could be run through a virtual machine within the host operating system.

History 

DVL was created by Thorsten Schneider, the founder of the TeutoHack laboratory at Bielefeld University, to use as a training system for his university lectures.

Design 

DVL is a SLAX-based distribution, and uses the Slackware .tgz package management system. It uses outdated versions of various software, to deliberately make it the most vulnerable operating system ever.

DVL is distributed as a live CD, allowing it to be booted directly from the distribution medium without installation on a PC or within a virtual machine.

See also

References

External links 

 Damn Vulnerable Linux official website

Free security software
Linux security software
SLAX-based distributions
Discontinued Linux distributions
Linux distributions